Aitor González Prieto (born 5 November 1990 in Ermua) is a Spanish cyclist, who last rode for UCI Professional Continental team .

References

External links

1990 births
Living people
Spanish male cyclists
Cyclists from the Basque Country (autonomous community)
People from Ermua
Sportspeople from Biscay